Michel Batista may refer to:

 Michel Batista (wrestler) (born 1984), Cuban freestyle wrestler
 Michel Batista (weightlifter) (born 1977), Cuban weightlifter